Shawn Harvey may refer to:

 Shawn Harvey (singer-songwriter)
 Shawn Harvey (basketball)
 Sean  Harvey (Photographer/Radio DJ)

See also
Shaun Harvey, businessman